Sajidur Rahman (born 30 December 1964) is a Bangladeshi Islamic scholar and educator. He is the Secretary General of Hefazat-e-Islam Bangladesh and Co-chairman of Al-Haiatul Ulya Lil-Jamiatil Qawmia Bangladesh, the highest authority of Qawmi Madrasah. He is also the Senior Vice President of Befaqul Madarisil Arabia Bangladesh, founding principle of Jamia Darul Arkam Al Islamia and Shaykhul Hadith of Jamia Islamia Yunusia.

Early life 
Sajidur Rahman was born on 30 December 1964, to Bengali Muslim parents Muhammad Ali and Ayesha Begum, in the village of Bedtala in Sarail, Brahmanbaria of Comilla District, East Pakistan. He completed his primary education from Natai Government Primary School in Brahmanbaria Sadar Upazila. In 1973, he was admitted to Yazdham Jamaat of Jamia Islamia Yunusia. After 3 years, he was admitted in Islamia Madrasa of Birasar. From this madrasa, he won the first place in the central examination of Edaraye Talimia Brahmanbaria, a regional board of education. Then he was admitted in Al-Jamiatul Ahlia Darul Ulum Moinul Islam. He completed his Dawra-e Hadith (Masters) from this Madrasa in 1984.

Career 
After completing his education, his career started with teaching at Al-Jamia al-Arabia Nasirul Islam Nazirhat. After teaching in this madrasa for 3 years, he joined Al-Jamiatul Ahlia Darul Ulum Moinul Islam. After teaching at Hathazari Madrasa for 3 years, he moved to Qatar. There he served as Khatib for 3 years. After returning country in 1994, he was appointed as Muhaddis of Jamia Islamia Yunusia, Brahmanbaria. In the same year, he founded Jamia Darul Arkam Al Islamia in West Medda, Brahmanbaria. He is currently the principal of this madrasa and serving as shaykhul hadith of Yunusia madrassa. He is the disciple of Shah Ahmad Shafi in Sufism.

On 2 November 2021, he was elected senior vice president of Befaqul Madarisil Arabia Bangladesh and vice president of Al-Haiatul Ulya Lil-Jamiatil Qawmia Bangladesh. On November 29, he was elected acting secretary general of Hefazat-e-Islam Bangladesh.

References 

1964 births
Living people
Bangladeshi Islamic religious leaders
Deobandis
20th-century Muslim scholars of Islam
People from Brahmanbaria district
Bangladeshi Sunni Muslim scholars of Islam
Hanafis
21st-century Bangladeshi politicians
Darul Uloom Hathazari Alumni
Bengali Muslim scholars of Islam